R356 road may refer to:
 R356 road (Ireland)
 R356 road (South Africa)